Chen Zeng (born 6 April 1994), born Cheng Chen and known as Tailang Chen-Zeng is a Chinese footballer currently playing as a midfielder for Zibo Cuju.

Club career
Chen Zeng would play for the Liaoning U18 team in the 2013 National Games of China. The Liaoning football association would create a team called Liaoning Youth to participate within the 2013 China League Two campaign and used the players from the 2013 National Games of China. The following season he would join Shenyang Dongjin before going abroad to Portugal to join Mafra to continue his football development. He would return to China and join Shijiazhuang Ever Bright, however it would be discovered by the Chinese Football Association on 20 March 2015 that he had lied about his age and suspended him from playing until 27 February 2016.

After completing his suspension he would rejoin Shenyang Dongjin for three seasons before joining Shijiazhuang Ever Bright again. On 19 September 2020 he would make his debut for Shijiazhuang Ever Bright in a Chinese FA Cup game against Tianjin TEDA in a 2–0 defeat.

Career statistics

References

External links

1994 births
Living people
Chinese footballers
Chinese expatriate footballers
Association football midfielders
C.D. Mafra players
Cangzhou Mighty Lions F.C. players
Shenyang Dongjin F.C. players
China League Two players
China League One players
Chinese Super League players
Chinese expatriate sportspeople in Portugal
Expatriate footballers in Portugal